Barkston railway station is a former station serving the village of Barkston, Lincolnshire. It was on the Great Northern Railway main line near to the now realigned (Allington chord) junction with the lines to Sleaford and Lincoln. The station was closed for passengers in 1955 and goods in 1964 . It has been demolished leaving no trace today of its existence.

References

Disused railway stations in Lincolnshire
Former Great Northern Railway stations
Railway stations in Great Britain opened in 1867
Railway stations in Great Britain closed in 1955